The Pachmarhi Biosphere Reserve is a non-use conservation area and biosphere reserve in the Satpura Range of Madhya Pradesh state in central India.

The conservation area was created in 1999 by the Indian government. It also contains animals from the Himalayan mountains and from the lower Western Ghats. UNESCO designated it a biosphere reserve in 2009.

Almost every year scouts and guides visit this place as a ‘pachmarhi camp’.

Geography
The Pachmarhi Biosphere Reserve is located within areas of Narmadapuram, Betul, and Chhindwara Districts in Madhya Pradesh.

It includes three wildlife conservation units: 
Bori Sanctuary (518.00 km2)
Pachmarhi Sanctuary (461.37 km2).
Satpura National Park (524.37 km2)

Satpura National Park is designated as the core zone and the remaining area of 4401.91 km2, including the Bori and Pachmarhi sanctuaries, serves as the buffer zone.

Ecology

The reserve is composed primarily of forest habitats, and is an important transition zone between the forest species of western and eastern India.

Flora 

The forests are dominated by teak (Tectona grandis). They include the westernmost groves of sal (Shorea robusta), which is the dominant tree of eastern India's forests. Other endemic vegetation includes wild mango, silver fern, jamun and arjun. The Cuddapah almond trees are abundantly found over the hills of Pachmarchi.

Ethnobotany
Fourteen ethno-botanical plant species occur in PBR have been studied, which are traded from the selected villages of the buffer zone area of PBR. Different plant parts of these important species are collected by the local people for their own consumption and trade. A part of the reserve vegetation has been studied by Prof. Chandra Prakash Kala, especially with respect to the indigenous uses of the plants.

Fauna
Large mammal species include tigers, leopard, wild bear, gaur (Bos gaurus), chital deer (Axis axis), muntjac deer, sambar deer (Cervus multicolour), and rhesus macaque.

The endemic fauna includes chinkara, nilgai, Asian wild dogs, the Indian wolf, bison, Indian giant squirrels, and flying squirrels.

See also
Biosphere reserves of India
Wildlife sanctuaries in Madhya Pradesh
 Indian Council of Forestry Research and Education

References

External links

"Pachmarhi - New Biosphere Reserve"
Biosphere Reserves of India
Enviro News, May 1999

Biosphere reserves of India
Wildlife sanctuaries in Madhya Pradesh
Betul district
Chhindwara district
Tourist attractions in Hoshangabad district
Pachmarhi
1999 establishments in Madhya Pradesh
Protected areas established in 1999